The government of Pedro Pierluisi Urrutia was formed in the weeks following the 2020 Puerto Rico gubernatorial election as he released a list of nominees for most of the positions before his swearing in on 2 January 2021. His New Progressive Party (PNP) not having a majority in either chamber of the 19th Legislative Assembly of Puerto Rico meant that he would have to further negotiate the approval of his nominees with the opposition parties that hold control of the legislature.

Party breakdown
Party breakdown of cabinet members (until April 2021), not including the governor:

The cabinet was composed of members of the PNP and at a point, three independent or technical positions (or people whose membership in a party was not clearly ascertained from any available media). After April 2021 it was composed as follows.

Members of the Cabinet
The Puerto Rican Cabinet is led by the Governor, along with, starting in 1986., the Secretary of Governance. The Cabinet is composed of all members of the Constitutional Council of Secretaries, who are the heads of the  executive departments, along with other Cabinet-level officers who report directly to the Governor of Puerto Rico or to the Secretary of Governance, but who are not heads nor members of  an executive office. All the Cabinet-level officers are at the same bureaucratic level as of the Secretaries.

Notes

References

Government of Puerto Rico
Governors of Puerto Rico
Members of the Cabinet of Puerto Rico by session
Cabinet of Puerto Rico
Pierluisi